Hélécine is a municipality of Wallonia located in the Belgian province of Walloon Brabant. On 1 January 2006 Hélécine had a total population of 3,068. The total area is 16.62 km² which gives a population density of 185 inhabitants per km².

The municipality consists of the following districts: Linsmeau, Neerheylissem, and Opheylissem.

References

External links
 

 
Municipalities of Walloon Brabant